Millwood is an unincorporated community and census-designated place (CDP) in Ware County, Georgia, United States, located west of Waycross. The community is part of the Waycross Micropolitan Statistical Area.

It was first listed as a CDP in the 2020 census with a population of 72.

History
A post office was established at Millwood in 1887.

The Georgia General Assembly incorporated Millwood as a town in 1905. The town's municipal charter was repealed in 1909.

Demographics

2020 census

Note: the US Census treats Hispanic/Latino as an ethnic category. This table excludes Latinos from the racial categories and assigns them to a separate category. Hispanics/Latinos can be of any race.

Geography 
Millwood is located near .

References

Former municipalities in Georgia (U.S. state)
Unincorporated communities in Ware County, Georgia
Census-designated places in Ware County, Georgia
Waycross, Georgia micropolitan area